The former government of Nikita Khrushchev was dissolved following the Soviet election of 1962.

Ministries

Committees

References 
General

Government of the Soviet Union > List
 

Specific

Soviet governments
1962 establishments in the Soviet Union
1964 disestablishments